The Glarus Alps are a mountain range in central Switzerland. They are bordered by the Uri Alps and the Schwyz Alps to the west, the Lepontine Alps to the south, the Appenzell Alps to the northeast. The eastern part of the Glarus Alps contains a major thrust fault that was declared a geologic UNESCO World Heritage Site (the Swiss Tectonic Arena Sardona).

The Glarus Alps extend well beyond the canton of Glarus, including parts of the cantons of Uri, Graubünden, and St Gallen. Conversely, not all the mountains in the canton of Glarus are part of the Glarus Alps, with those to the north of the Urner Boden and to the west of the valley of the river Linth considered to be part of the Schwyz Alps.

Geography

The main chain of the Glarus Alps can be divided into six minor groups, separated from each other by passes, the lowest of which exceeds 7,500 ft. The westernmost of these is the Crispalt, a rugged range including many peaks of nearly equal height. The highest of these are the Piz Giuv (3,096 m) and Piz Nair. The name Crispalt is given to a southern, but secondary, peak of Piz Giuv, measuring 3,070 m. West of the main group is the Rienzenstock, while a northern outlyer culminates in the Bristen. East of the Crispalt, the Chrüzli Pass separates this from the rather higher mass of the Oberalpstock (3,328 m).

Here occurs a partial break in the continuity of the chain. The crest of the snowy range connecting the Oberalpstock with the Tödi nowhere sinks to 9,000 feet, but makes a sweep convex to the north, forming a semicircular recess, whose numerous torrents are all poured into the Rhine through the Val Russein below Disentis. Two glacier passes lead over this part of the chain — one to west, over the Brunnigletscher to the Maderanertal; the other to the north-east, over the Sand Glacier, to the Linthal.

The Tödi, the highest of the range and of north-eastern Switzerland (3,614 m), is attended by numerous secondary peaks that arise from the extensive snow-fields surrounding the central mountain. A very considerable outlyer, whose chief summits are the Schärhorn and the Gross Windgällen, belonging to the canton of Uri, is connected with the Tödi by the range of the Clariden , north to the Hüfi Glacier. A less important branch encloses the Biferten Glacier, and terminates in the Selbsanft, south of Tierfehd. Towards the valley of the Vorderrhein a high promontory stretches nearly due south from the central peaks of the Tödi, and is crowned by the summit of the Piz Posta Biala. Another considerable ramification of the same mass terminates farther to the east in the peak of the Cavistrau.

The Kisten Pass separates the Tödi group from the Hausstock, whose summit attains 3,158 m; a branch of this latter group forms the range of the Kärpf in the canton of Glarus. The Hausstock is cut off from the rather lower but more extended mass of the Vorab by the Panixer Pass (7,907 ft). Numerous summits, of which the Vorab proper and Piz Grisch are the most important, approach very near, but do not quite attain to 10,000 feet.

The eastern limit of the latter group is marked by the  — the most frequented of those connecting the Canton Glarus with the Vorderrhein — beyond which arises a wide-stretching mass of rock and glacier, which is part of the Glarus thrust and culminates at Piz Sardona. This mass is cleft by a deep valley — the Calfeisental: one branch, culminating in the Pizol (2,844 m), extends east over Pfäfers, while another, including the highest peak of the canton of St. Gallen, the Ringelspitz (3,247 m), runs due east to the low Kunkels Pass (1,357 m), separating this range from the Calanda.

Principal summits

Glaciers
Main glaciers :

Hüfi Glacier
Limmern Glacier
Biferten Glacier
Vorab Glacier

Passes

The chief passes of the Tödi Range, from the Oberalp Pass to the Klausen Pass, are:

Note: road status .

See also
Swiss Alps

References

Swisstopo maps

Maps
 Swiss official cartography (Swiss Federal Office of Topography - Swisstopo); on-line version: map.geo.admin.ch

External links
 
 The Glarus Alps on SummitPost

Mountain ranges of Switzerland
Landforms of the canton of Glarus
Glarus–Graubünden border
Graubünden–Uri border
Graubünden–St. Gallen border
Glarus–St. Gallen border
Mountain ranges of the Alps
Swiss Alps